Granite Mountain, 2036 m (6680 ft) prominence: 134 m, is a mountain in the Rossland Range of the Monashee Mountains in the West Kootenay region of southeastern British Columbia, Canada.  It is located just northwest of the city of Rossland and is the second highest of the three mountains forming the core of the Red Mountain Ski Resort, the others being Grey Mountain and the eponymous Red Mountain.

See also
Granite Mountain (disambiguation)

References

Two-thousanders of British Columbia
West Kootenay
Monashee Mountains
Kootenay Land District